Charles Delaware Staigers was an American cornetist. He was born on August 20, 1899 in Muncie, Indiana. In 1914, he was hired to play in Patrick Conway's band. In 1918, he joined John Philip Sousa's band as the assistant to cornet soloist Frank Simon. He stayed with John Philip Sousa through 1920. He played "Taps" at John Philip Sousa's funeral. After leaving Sousa, he became first trumpeter at The Hippodrome and later at The Strand Theatre in New York City. In 1926, he joined the Goldman Band. His first appearance with The Goldman Band in Central Park before a crowd of over 25,000 people drew vociferous applause and bravos. He played with The Goldman Band through 1934, and also for the 1942 season.

He died on July 12, 1950, at age 50. In the words of Edwin Franko Goldman, Staigers was the "greatest cornetist in the world".

Discography
Solo recordings
 The Carnival Of Venice (1929) [Victor 21191-A]
 Napoli-Bellstedt (1929) [Victor 21191-B]
 My Heaven Of Love (1929) [Victor 22429-A]
 (Recorded October 25, 1929, at Liederkranz Hall, New York City.)
 Mi Cielo De Amor (1930) [Victor 22429-A]
 (Released In Italy)
 Princess Alice-Bellstedt (1929-1930) [Unknown]

With Nat Shilkret and The Victor Salon Group
 Oh, Promise Me (1929) [Victor 22051-B]

ARTCO recordings
 Official Bugle Calls (1939) [ARTCO 2897]
 Ten Trumpet/Cornet Instruction Lessons (1939) [ARTCO]

Children's recordings
 Rusty In Orchestraville (1946) [Capitol BC 35]
  (Featured playing excerpt from "Carnival Of Venice" on Side 3)

Published works
 Hazel (Dedicated To My Wife) (1929) Carl Fischer
 Solo or Duet for various wind instruments
 The Carnival Of Venice  (1936) Carl Fischer
 Solo for trumpet or cornet with band or piano accompaniment
 The Three Stars (1940) Carl Fischer
 Trumpet trio with piano
 Flexibility Studies and Technical Drills - Part 1 [0 3564] (1950) Carl Fischer
 Flexibility Studies and Technical Drills - Part 2 [0 3648] (1950) Carl Fischer

Unpublished works
 International Fantasie (1928)
 Cornet Solo with Band Accompaniment
 Fantasie Caprice (1932)
 Cornet Solo with Band Accompaniment
 Capitol City (March) (1934)
 March for Concert Band

References

External links
 Del Staigers - Cornet & Trumpet Soloist - YouTube
 Staigers, Del - Discography of American Historical Recordings

American cornetists
1899 births
1950 deaths